Aloeides mullini, the Mullin's copper, is a butterfly in the  family Lycaenidae. It is found in eastern Zimbabwe. The habitat consists of montane grassland.

Both sexes feed from flowers. They have been recorded from late August to late September.

References

Butterflies described in 1996
Aloeides
Endemic fauna of Zimbabwe
Butterflies of Africa